National and State Libraries Australia (NSLA), formerly National and State Libraries Australasia, is the peak body that represents the national, state and territory libraries of Australia. The libraries collaborate on and support working groups addressing issues including: copyright issues, archival collections, collection development, marketing, collecting and preserving digital content, collections and services focusing on Indigenous Australians, and other issues relating to the collection, storage and dissemination of the various types of resources held by member institutions. It also compiles annual statistics on public library activities and usage throughout Australia, and publishes statistics on the services of its own collaborating libraries. Precursors to the organisation include the State Librarians Council, the State Libraries Council and Council of Australian State Libraries (CASL).

NLSA also collaborates with partner organisations such as the Australian Research Council on research and development projects. One of its latest major completed projects is the development of the National edeposit service (NED), "an online service for the deposit, archiving, management, discovery and delivery of published electronic material across Australia", which was formally launched in August 2019.

History
State librarians from New South Wales, Western Australia, South Australia, Tasmania, Queensland and Victoria first met as the State Librarians Council in March 1973, with the aim of forming a peak body to represent and lobby for their organisations in dealings with the Commonwealth Government. The Northern Territory  joined in 1980, Australian Capital Territory in 1987 and the National Library of Australia from 1986 onwards. In 1990 it was renamed to the State Libraries Council, with the membership including the CEOs of the Northern Territory and Australian Capital Territory Library and Information Services, and the National Library of Australia.

From 1992, the organisation became the Council of Australian State Libraries (CASL). During this time, many projects were developed, such as the Distributed National Collection agreement and the AskNow online virtual reference service. With the National Library of New Zealand attending first as an observer and then a member, in 2005, it decided on a change of name to reflect this, becoming National and State Libraries Australasia (NSLA). The first NSLA meeting was held at the State Library of Western Australia in September 2006.

At the November 2017 meeting, NSLA developed a new strategic plan and business model, deciding to focus on Australian constituents and stakeholders, and from 2018 the name became National and State Libraries Australia.

Description
The NSLA is a national organisation, whose membership consists of the directors or CEOs of the state libraries and the Director-General of the National Library of Australia. It manages a wide range of collaborative initiatives among its member libraries and with other organisations. It aims to improve library services throughout its member libraries by collaboration, and also contributes to public policy affecting the library sector. The Executive Officer and Program Coordinator of the organisation are based at State Library Victoria.

Research, alliances and projects
One of NSLA's ongoing projects is collecting, collating and making accessible a range of statistics pertaining to public library services in Australia, which are available on its website dating back to 1996.

The organisation has been involved in a number of projects funded by the Australian Research Council (ARC), such as Climate History Australia and Grey Literature Strategies. It has alliances with the Australian Digital Alliance, Australian Libraries Copyright Committee, Australian Media Literacy Alliance, GLAM Peak and the National Early Language and Literacy Strategy. The individual member libraries also participate in a number of state-wide or national projects.

It runs advisory groups on a number of topics and manages the "Culturally Safe Libraries Program", with the aim of making "programs, services and collections that are accessible, respectful and responsive to Aboriginal and Torres Strait Islander peoples’ needs and perspectives".

NED

Legal deposit is an important function of national and state libraries. The federal Copyright Act 1968  and legal deposit legislation pertaining to each state mandates that publishers of any kind must deposit copies of their publications in the National Library of Australia as well as in the state or territory library in their jurisdiction. Until the 21st century, this has applied to all types of printed materials (and in some states, to audio-visual formats as well), and on 17 February 2016, the federal legal deposit provisions were extended to cover electronic publications of all types. Most states and territories are  reviewing or amending existing legislation to extend to digital publications as well.

The NLSA consortium has developed and delivered the National edeposit (NED) service for electronic publications, with the project led by the NED Steering Group, consisting of representatives from each member library. NED was formally launched in August 2019, and is now running in all NSLA libraries. Work continues on the system, with further enhancements are in the pipeline.

Indigenous heritage position statement
In May 2021, NSLA published a position statement on Indigenous Cultural and Intellectual Property (ICIP), which recognises Aboriginal and Torres Strait Islander peoples as the traditional owners and custodians of Australia and acknowledges the gaps in Australian legislation in protecting their cultural heritage. NSLA member libraries "acknowledge their collective, individual and moral responsibilities to ensure that management and access to these collection materials is culturally informed and respectful [which] includes recognition and protection of the ongoing, communal nature of Indigenous Cultural and Intellectual Property (ICIP) rights".

Member libraries
 members are:

 Libraries ACT
 Libraries Tasmania
 National Library of Australia
 Library and Archives NT
 State Library of New South Wales 
 State Library of Queensland
 State Library of South Australia
 State Library of Tasmania
 State Library Victoria
 State Library of Western Australia

Each member library is represented by their Chief Executive, State Librarian, or Director-General.

References

External links
 

Library consortia
2006 establishments in Australia